The WTVR TV Tower is  tall a free-standing lattice tower in Richmond, Virginia. It broadcasts WTVR-FM and has been in operation since 1953.

History 

Upon completion in 1953, the tower became the tallest in the United States and the second tallest lattice tower in the world after the Eiffel Tower and only surpassed in height by five buildings; the Empire State Building, Chrysler Building, 70 Pine Street, 40 Wall Street & the GE Building. It was a substantive increase from previous tallest towers of any type built in the United States, the NSS Annapolis. It remains to this day the tallest man made structure in Virginia.

The tower is currently only used by WTVR-FM. Even though WTVR-TV and WTVR-FM still share the same WTVR call letters they are no longer affiliated with each other and are under different ownership. WTVR-TV no longer broadcasts from this tower. WTVR-TV shares a transmitter with PBS member stations WCVE-TV and WCVW. WTVR-TV stopped transmitting from this tower during the analog to digital conversion in 2009. The tower is still called the WTVR-TV tower because of its history, despite no longer broadcasting from this tower. On November 1, 2017, iHeartMedia announced that WTVR-FM, along with all of their sister stations in Richmond and Chattanooga, would be sold to Entercom due to that company's merger with CBS Radio. The sale was completed on December 19, 2017. The tower is considered part of the Richmond skyline and can be seen for several miles around. WTVR-TV's West Broad studios is located directly next to the tower. The station used a graphical version of the tower in its news opens for several years in the 1980s and early 1990s.

Stations

Radio
Currently only WTVR-FM transmits from WTVR Tower.

See also
 Lattice tower
 List of famous transmission sites

References

External links
  Building the WTVR CBS 6 Tower
 WTVR Tower, Richmond - SkyscraperPage.com

Lattice towers
Richmond, Virginia
Towers completed in 1953